"R.I.P./Merry Christmas" is the fifteenth single by Bump of Chicken that was released on November 25, 2009.

Track listing
 "R.I.P." - 5:51
 "Merry Christmas" - 6:51
  (hidden track) - This track is the longest song ever among their hidden tracks.

Personnel
Fujiwara Motoo — Guitar, vocals
Masukawa Hiroaki — Guitar
Naoi Yoshifumi — Bass
Masu Hideo — Drums

Chart performance

References

External links
R.I.P./Merry Christmas on the official Bump of Chicken website.

2009 singles
2009 songs
Bump of Chicken songs
Toy's Factory singles